Stone Point is a point with a small islet lying off it, marking the south side of the entrance to Hope Bay, at the northeast end of Antarctic Peninsula. Named by the United Kingdom Antarctic Place-Names Committee (UK-APC) for H.W. Stone, First Mate on the Hunt, Royal Navy, in 1952.

Headlands of Trinity Peninsula